Killing Music is the seventh studio album by British death metal band Benediction. It was released on the Nuclear Blast label  in 2008.
Two versions have been released: a regular jewel case edition CD, and also a limited edition CD that comes packaged with a bonus DVD.

Track listing

Credits 

 Dave Hunt – vocals
 Darren Brookes – guitars
 Peter Rewinsky – guitars
 Frank Healy – bass guitar
 Neil Hutton – drums
 Big K of Smoking Beagle Design – cover artwork and inlay

References

2008 albums